Potbelly may refer to:

 Pot belly, deposits of body fat localised around the abdomen
 Potbelly stove, a type of cast-iron wood-burning stove
 Potbelly Sandwich Shop
 Potbelly sculpture, a type of ancient monument found in southern Mesoamerica
 Ptolemy VIII Physcon, king of Egypt c. 182 BC – 116 BC..
Göbekli Tepe, Turkish for "Potbelly Hill" 
Potbelly airplant

Potbellied may also refer to:

Vietnamese Pot-bellied, a breed of domesticated pig originating in Vietnam
Pot-bellied seahorse

See also
Kettlebelly  (disambiguation)